The gristle-headed splayfoot salamander (Chiropterotriton chondrostega) is a species of salamander in the family Plethodontidae.
It is endemic to the Sierra Madre Oriental of east-central Mexico.

Its natural habitat is subtropical or tropical moist montane forests.
It is threatened by habitat loss.

References

Endemic amphibians of Mexico
Chiropterotriton
Fauna of the Sierra Madre Oriental
Taxonomy articles created by Polbot
Amphibians described in 1941
Taxa named by Edward Harrison Taylor